Jason Bright (born 7 March 1973) is a retired Australian racing driver who competed in the Virgin Australia Supercars Championship. He drove the No. 56 Ford FG X Falcon for Britek Motorsport, a satellite team of Prodrive Racing Australia, before retiring from full-time racing at the end of the 2017.

Racing career

Australia
Bright started his motor racing career at the age of 15 in 1988 and won the Junior Club Championship at the Gippsland Go-Kart Club. One year later, Bright won the Senior Club Championships.

In 1990, Bright was the runner-up in the Victorian Go Karting Championship and he went on to win the championship in 1991.

1992 saw Bright move into single-seaters and into the Victorian Formula Ford Championship and finished fourth and dovetailed this with another go-kart campaign, finishing third overall in Australia.

Bright made his debut in the Australian Formula Ford Championship in 1993, in a factory-backed Spectrum. In the season, he had a best finish of sixth at Symmons Plains, but in the Australian Formula Ford Festival at Winton, he finished second. Bright finished third in the 1994 Australian Formula Ford Championship, behind Steven Richards and Gavin Monaghan. He won the Formula Ford race supporting the Australian Grand Prix.

1995 was a fantastic season for Bright, winning the Australian Formula Ford Championship, winning the Australian Grand Prix support race and the Lexmark Indy 300 support race. He was also nominated for two major Australian awards.

He finished runner-up in the 1996 Australian Drivers' Championship behind Paul Stokell, winning 3 races. But in 1997, Bright dominated that championship, winning seven races and made his V8 Supercar debut at Symmons Plains, finishing ninth, but better was to come as he finished third in the Sandown 500 with Alan Jones but failed to capitalise at Bathurst a few weeks later, finishing eleventh.

In 1998, Bright became a full-time touring car driver, joining Stone Brothers Racing, showing considerable promise with several top six performances and a third place at Calder Park. He and co-driver Steven Richards won the Bathurst Classic (the V8Supercar version of the Bathurst 1000 that year) coming back after Bright crashed heavily in practice and only being able to record a single flying lap in qualifying because of the extensive repairs.

In 1999, he had six podiums, including a win at Hidden Valley Raceway and three pole positions. He also took part in the sportscar race at Adelaide to bring in 2000 and finished third in class.

2001 saw Bright return to the V8 Supercar series after a stint in Champ Car competition (see below), with the multi-championship-winning Holden Racing Team. Bright won the season-opening Clipsal 500 and led for most of the first half of the season before fading to third. 2002 was another good season at HRT, with 2 wins and a pole.

2003 saw Bright move to Paul Weel Racing and consistency was the key to get him fourth in the standings. 2004 saw Bright win three races finishing third in the championship.  Bright also won the 2003 Bathurst 24 Hour race in a Holden Monaro driving with the late Peter Brock, Greg Murphy and Todd Kelly.  This car was run by rival V8 Supercar team Garry Rogers Motorsport.

Bright crossed marques in 2005 when he moved to Ford Performance Racing.  Bright finished ninth overall for FPR.

Bright had an awful start to the 2006 season, finishing 15th and 25th in Adelaide. However he improved throughout the season, ending with a win at the Sandown 500 and the inaugural Desert 400 at the Bahrain International Circuit as well as podiums at Surfers Paradise and Symmons Plains.

For 2007, Bright left FPR to join his struggling Britek Motorsport team and battled in the midfield. After two seasons with funds tightening, Bright leased out one of his two Racing Entitlement Contracts and focussed on just one car. Further to the team cutbacks, Bright came to an arrangement with Stone Brothers Racing to do vehicle preparation and but most of his team equipment and workshop on the market, effectively shutting down Britek as a racing team. His form gradually improved at SBR and jumped forward when his older Britek BF Falcon was replaced with a SBR FG Falcon picking up a third at the Sydney 500 and leading the race, but by this stage Bright's major sponsor Fujitsu had announced they would be leaving the team.

Brad Jones Racing team owner, Kim Jones confirmed that Bright will be joining the team for the 2010 season.

Bright confirmed that he would re-join Prodrive Racing Australia after leaving BJR for the 2017 Supercars Championship season, just 10 years after he left the team for Britek Motorsports, making him the fourth driver in the team.

Overseas
Bright's first taste of international competition was in 1996, a hectic year in which he raced in both the United States and Australia.  He won two races in the US Formula Ford 2000 Championship, at St. Petersburg and Mosport, finished second in the championship behind Steve Knapp and was awarded Rookie of the Year.

In 2000, Bright left Australia to join the Indy Lights series in America, where he had five podium finishes and finished sixth in the standings.  He also made his Champ Car debut at the Lexmark Indy 300 that year.

In 2006, he drove for Prodrive in an Aston Martin at the Sebring 12 Hour finishing fourth. 2013 he made his debut at the Le mans 24 Hour race driving for 8 Star Motorsports. They finished 10th in class.

Britek Motorsport

Bright established his own V8 Supercar team, Britek Motorsport, in 2005.  He was driving for Ford Performance Racing at the time and thus his team had restrictions on testing and driver licensing. The team is officially referred to as Fujitsu Racing, after their marquee sponsor. Bright joined his own team in 2007. He nearly won the 2007 Bathurst 1000 but a bad tyre call in the pits left him hitting the wall at McPhillamy Park with 10 laps to go.

Britek also briefly ran Ford Australias entry in the Australian Rally Championship, a pair of Super 2000 Ford Fiestas for Michael Guest and Darren Windus.

The team wound down after the 2008 season. The team's franchises remained live in 2009 with one leased out and Bright running the other as a Stone Brothers Racing customer team. At the end of 2009, the leased franchise was sold off to Brad Jones Racing.

Brad Jones Racing

For the 2010 season, Bright drove a Holden VE Commodore for Brad Jones Racing.

Jason Bright's 2010 season was rather inconsistent, but a couple of good qualifying performances at the back half of the year,  a 4th place at the 2010 Bathurst 1000, and a podium finish at Symmons Plains, finishing behind Paul Dumbrell and Mark Winterbottom led to an overall result of 14th place in the championship. Race 8 in Perth saw Bright win Brad Jones Racing its first-ever V8 Supercars win. Bright followed this up with a win at Winton and was amongst the favourites to win the championship with a high of 4th in the championship standings. However, Bright's 2011 season faded away. Later in the season, Bright injured his ribs and missed 3 events as a result. His 2012 season was rather inconsistent, finishing 16th - for the second year in a row.

In 2013, with the introduction of the Car Of The Future rules, Brad Jones Racing saw a dramatic change in performance in both Bright and teammate Fabian Coulthard. Using the new Holden VF Commodore, the team saw back-to-back wins at Tasmania, with Bright winning his first race since Winton 2011. Bright then went on to win Race 4 at Pukekohe Raceway, which awarded him the inaugural Jason Richards Memorial Trophy, for scoring the most points over the weekend; his famous celebration ended up in him busting a fluorescent light while jumping for joy. Bright's form thus far has been rather consistent, landing him with enough points to make the Top 10 in the 2013 championship. A stroke of bad luck, however, saw Bright not being able to compete in Race 1 at Gold Coast, after Andrew Jones severely damaged the car during practice. However, they did manage to repair the car to such an extent that they competed in Race 2, where they managed to place 15th. Bright finished the 2013 Championship season in 7th place, one place below teammate Fabian Coulthard.

Bright had a disastrous start to 2014, with a monumental crash in Race 3 at the Clipsal 500 giving him his first and only DNF for the season. Since then, Bright has been rather inconsistent, with only one podium finish; a win at the Auckland 500.

Career results

Complete Supercars Championship results
(key) (Races in bold indicate pole position) (Races in italics indicate fastest lap)

Bathurst 1000 results

American Open-Wheel
(key)

Indy Lights results

Champ Car

International GT Racing

Complete American Le Mans Series results
(key) (Races in bold indicate pole position) (Races in italics indicate fastest lap)

Complete FIA World Endurance Championship results

Bathurst 24 Hour results

12 Hours of Sebring results

Bathurst 12 Hour results

24 Hours of Le Mans results

References

 Jason's Website
 Driver DataBase profile
 ChampCar Stats profile
 Indy Lights profile
 Conrod V8 profile
 NMD Driver Articles page
 Racing Reference profile

1973 births
Living people
Champ Car drivers
Indy Lights drivers
Supercars Championship drivers
People from Moe, Victoria
Racing drivers from Victoria (Australia)
Bathurst 1000 winners
Formula Ford drivers
Formula Holden drivers
American Le Mans Series drivers
Australian Touring Car Championship drivers
24 Hours of Le Mans drivers
FIA World Endurance Championship drivers
U.S. F2000 National Championship drivers
Aston Martin Racing drivers
Garry Rogers Motorsport drivers
Stone Brothers Racing drivers
Matt Stone Racing drivers
Dick Johnson Racing drivers